The W. T. Cowles House is a historic house located at 43-47 William Street in Glens Falls, Warren County, New York.

Description and history 
It was built in 1897 and is a rectangular, -story, vernacular Queen Anne–style residence. It features a porch and roof with gable and jerkin head dormers. It also has some Colonial Revival style design elements. It was designed by architect and Glen Falls native Ephraim B. Potter (1855-1925).

It was added to the National Register of Historic Places on September 29, 1984.

See also
 National Register of Historic Places listings in Warren County, New York

References

Houses on the National Register of Historic Places in New York (state)
Queen Anne architecture in New York (state)
Colonial Revival architecture in New York (state)
Houses completed in 1897
Houses in Warren County, New York
National Register of Historic Places in Warren County, New York